Nathalie Gastineau (born 23 April 1981) is a former French female canoeist who won at senior level the Wildwater Canoeing World Championships.

References

External links
 Nathalie Gastineau at Daily Motion

1981 births
Living people
French female canoeists
Place of birth missing (living people)